Apollonius of Tralles (in Caria) was a Ancient Greek sculptor who flourished in the 2nd century BCE. With his brother Tauriscus, he executed the marble group known as the Farnese Bull, representing Zethus and Amphion tying the revengeful Dirce to the tail of a wild bull.

References

Hellenistic sculptors
Ancient Greeks in Caria
2nd-century BC Greek people
People from Tralles